This is a list of Arctic cetaceans.

Cetacea

Balaenidae
Bowhead whale (ᐊᕐᕕᖅ, arviq) Balaena mysticetus
Balaenopteridae
Fin whale Balaenoptera physalus
Sei whale Balaenoptera borealis
Blue whale (ᐊᕐᕕᖅ ᓂᐊᖁᕐᓗᖕᓂᖅᓴᖅ, ᐃᐸᒃ, arviq niaqurlungniqsaq, ipak) Balaenoptera musculus
Common minke whale Balaenoptera acutorostrata
Humpback whale Megaptera novaeangliae
Delphinidae
Killer whale (ᐋᕐᓗ, ᐊᕐᓗᒃ, ᐋᕐᓗᒃ, aarlu, arluk, aarluk) Orcinus orca
Long-finned pilot whale
Atlantic white-sided dolphin (aarluarsuk)
White-beaked dolphin
Monodontidae
Narwhal (ᑑᒑᓕᒃ, tuugaalik, ᕿᓚᓗᒐᖅ ᑑᒑᓕᒃ, qilalugaq tuugaalik) Monodon monoceros
Beluga whale (ᕿᓇᓗᒐᖅ, qilalugaq; Бөлүүгэ) Delphinapterus leucas
Cumberland Sound beluga
Mysticeti
Gray whale
Phocoenidae
Harbour porpoise Phocoena phocoena (niisa)
Physeteridae
Sperm whale (ᑭᒍᑎᓕᒃ, kigutilik) Physeter macrocephalus
Ziphiidae
Northern bottlenose whale Hyperoodon ampullatus

References

Cetacean
Arctic